Len or Leonard Stevens or Stephens may refer to:

 Len Stevens (composer) (died 1989), British composer
 Len Stevens (basketball) (born 1942), retired college basketball coach
Leonard Stephens, American football player
Leonard R. Stephens